Captain Rolim Adolfo Amaro (September 15, 1942 - July 8, 2001), known as "Comandante Rolim," was a Brazilian pilot and airline owner and founder of TAM Airlines.

Biography
At age 21, he became a pilot for a new air taxi company known as TAM – Táxi Aéreo Marília. The company began its operation in 1961 with the alliance of 10 young pilots. At the time, they transported cargo and charter passengers between Paraná, São Paulo, and Mato Grosso. After six years in the company, Amaro left Taxi Aéreo Marília. At the same time, it was sold to businessman Orlando Ometto, its headquarters moved to São Paulo, and the company profile changed when it became a courier company.

Upon leaving the company, Amaro, being at ease with personalized service, became an independent pilot. He bought his first airplane, a Cessna 170, and moved with his family to São Félix do Araguaia, where he began his first business project and founded Araguaia Transportes Aéreos (ATA). Two years later, the company had 15 airplanes.

Captain Amaro’s reconciliation with TAM took place in 1971, when Ometto asked him to become a minority partner owning 33% of the stocks. At the time, the company was going through a difficult financial period and was only transporting 3000 passengers. The following year, Amaro acquired half of the TAM stock and took over management of the company. He introduced his trademark and began practicing his primary philosophy: “Focus on the client by offering quality service”.

In 1976, TAM - Transportes Aéreos Regionais emerges as a scheduled regional airline, which learned from the experience of TAM - Táxi Aéreo Marília. By then, Amaro owned 67% of the new company. The first year, while domestic aviation was growing 15% a year, TAM was registering an increase of 70% every six months. Amaro later took full control of the company’s stock.

Amaro died in a helicopter crash at Fortuna Guazú, 38 kilometers from the Paraguayan city of Pedro Juan Caballero. At the time of his death, the company had grown to the point of being almost even with direct competitor Varig.

References

                   

1942 births
2001 deaths
Aviators killed in aviation accidents or incidents
Brazilian aviators
People from São Paulo (state)
TAM Airlines
20th-century Brazilian businesspeople
Victims of aviation accidents or incidents in Paraguay
Victims of aviation accidents or incidents in 2001
Victims of helicopter accidents or incidents